John Pryor Hand (November 10, 1850 – May 22, 1923) was an American jurist.

Born in Henry County, Illinois, Hand studied at Rock River Seminary in Mount Morris, Illinois. In 1872, Hand received his bachelor's degree from University of Iowa. He was admitted to the Illinois bar in 1875 and practiced law in Cambridge, Illinois. Hand served as county judge for Henry County and then as assistant United States for the Northern Illinois District. From 1900 until his resignation in 1913, Hand served on the Illinois Supreme Court and was chief justice. Hand died in Cambridge, Illinois.

Notes

External links
 

1850 births
1923 deaths
People from Henry County, Illinois
University of Iowa alumni
Illinois lawyers
Illinois state court judges
Chief Justices of the Illinois Supreme Court
People from Cambridge, Illinois
Justices of the Illinois Supreme Court
19th-century American lawyers